 

A clutch of eggs is the group of eggs produced by birds, amphibians, or reptiles, often at a single time, particularly those laid in a nest.

In birds, destruction of a clutch by predators (or removal by humans, for example the California condor breeding program) results in double-clutching. The technique is used to double the production of a species' eggs, in the California condor case, specifically to increase population size. The act of putting one's hand in a nest to remove eggs is known as "dipping the clutch".

Size
Clutch size differs greatly between species, sometimes even within the same genus. It may also differ within the same species due to many factors including habitat, health, nutrition, predation pressures, and time of year. Clutch size variation can also reflect variation in optimal reproduction effort. In birds, clutch size can vary within a species due to various features (age and health of laying female, ability of male to supply food, and abundance of prey), while some species are determinant layers, laying a species-specific number of eggs. Long-lived species tend to have smaller clutch sizes than short-lived species (see also r/K selection theory). The evolution of optimal clutch size is also driven by other factors, such as parent–offspring conflict.

In birds, ornithologist David Lack carried out much research into regulation of clutch size.   In species with altricial young, he proposed that optimal clutch size was determined by the number of young a parent could feed until fledgling. In precocial birds, Lack determined that clutch size was determined by the nutrients available to egg-laying females.  An experimental study in Black Brent Geese (Black Brant), which rarely lay more than five eggs, found that the probability of an egg successfully leading to a fledged gosling declined from 0.81 for two-egg clutches to 0.50 for seven-egg clutches, whilst the nesting period increased with the increasing number of eggs laid.  This suggests that there is no benefit for female Black Brant to lay more than five eggs.

Gallery

See also
Oology (the scientific study of eggs)
Viviparity

References

Birds
Bird breeding
Aviculture
Oology